Linda zayuensis is a species of beetle in the family Cerambycidae. It was described by Pu in 1981. It is known from China.

References

zayuensis
Beetles described in 1981